Peter Singh is a Canadian politician who was elected in the 2019 Alberta general election to represent the electoral district of Calgary-East in the 30th Alberta Legislature as a member of the United Conservative Party (UCP). He is a Fijian immigrant to Canada.

In May 2019, an investigation was launched by Alberta's election commissioner into Singh's conduct during his 2018 UCP nomination campaign in Calgary-East. Singh was accused by four of his former opponents in November 2018 of using "fraud, forgery, improper inducement and bribery" to gain votes during the nomination campaign. An internal UCP investigation had previously cleared Singh of any wrongdoing.

Electoral history

References

United Conservative Party MLAs
Living people
Businesspeople from Calgary
Politicians from Calgary
Fijian emigrants to Canada
Canadian people of Fijian descent
Canadian politicians of Indian descent
21st-century Canadian politicians
Year of birth missing (living people)